"Don't You Believe It" is a song written by Burt Bacharach and Bob Hillard and recorded by Andy Williams. Released as a single, the B-side was a cover of the George Gershwin song "Summertime".

Chart performance
The song reached No. 15 on the Billboard Easy Listening chart and No. 39 on the Hot 100 in 1962.

References

External links
 

1962 songs
1962 singles
Andy Williams songs
Songs with music by Burt Bacharach
Songs with lyrics by Bob Hilliard
Columbia Records singles